The Columbia Theatre, located at 1112 F Street NW, Washington, DC 20004, was a theater built and opened in 1891, closed and demolished in 1959. The Arnold & Porter Building is on the site today.

Loew's Fox Theatre
The theater was taken over by Marcus Loew in 1915 in his first Loew's Theaters venture outside New York, to present vaudeville and movies. Among them Going Native was a 1940 and 1941 annual revue show Arthur Godfrey was staged and produced by Eugene Forde.

References

Cinemas and movie theaters in Washington, D.C.
Buildings and structures completed in 1891
Buildings and structures demolished in 1959
Demolished buildings and structures in Washington, D.C.